KKRN is a radio station broadcasting a community radio format licensed to Bella Vista, California and serves the cities/towns of Round Mountain, California, Burney, California, and Redding, California.

History
KKRN began broadcasting on May 12, 2008.

See also
List of community radio stations in the United States

References

External links
 

Shasta County, California
2010 establishments in California
KRN
Radio stations established in 2010
Community radio stations in the United States